The St. Francis Shangri-La Place, also known as The St. Francis Towers 1 & 2 are twin-tower residential condominium skyscrapers in Mandaluyong, Philippines. The towers are the 6th and 7th-tallest buildings in the country and Metro Manila as well, and are currently the second tallest twin towers in the Philippines surpassing Pacific Plaza Towers with a height of 212.88 metres from the ground to its architectural spire. It also has two of the most floors in the Philippines. The buildings have 60 floors above ground, including a podium which connects the two towers, and 5 basement levels for parking, and are considered one of the most prestigious residential buildings in the Philippines.

Construction
Groundbreaking for the towers were held in January 2005, months ahead of its official launching. Topping-off ceremonies was held on June 24, 2008, although only one tower is actually considered topped-off during that time.

The towers were completed and opened in 2009 and taking over as the tallest twin-towers in The Philippines from Pacific Plaza Towers.

Architecture and design
The St. Francis Shangri-La Place was masterplanned and designed by Wong Tung International Ltd., in cooperation with local architectural firm Recio + Casas Architects. Structural design for the building was provided by Arup, and reviewed by international engineering firm Magnusson Klemencic Associates.

The buildings mechanical, electrical, and santiray engineering works was designed by WSP Hong Kong Ltd. Interior design was made by Brennan Beer Gorman Monk Architects (Interior Design).

The construction team is composed of Jose Aliling & Associates (Project / Construction Management); Davis Langdon & Seah Philippines Inc. (Quantity Surveying); and EEI Corporation (General Contractor).

Structural dampers

Due to the tower's location being close to an active fault in a highly seismic region and also subjected to typhoon winds, the St. Francis Shangri-La Place was the first building in the world to feature a revolutionary ‘damping’ system designed by international engineering company Ove Arup & Partners. The new system, which minimizes the standard wobble in high-rise buildings, employs the same technology used to strengthen the Millennium Bridge in London. This makes the St. Francis Shangri-La Place one of the safest buildings.

The usual methods employed to strengthen buildings are to reinforce it with significant extra structure or to install tuned mass dampers. Both methods are not only expensive, but also make the building stiffer and heavier while consuming valuable space. The Arup solution works by inserting Viscous Dampers into the St. Francis Shangri-La Place to act as energy absorbers and damp out vibrations. Viscous dampers connect deep reinforced concrete outriggers from the central core of each building to the perimeter columns at one level. The added damping so derived, in excess of 6% of critical controls wind-induced motions, achieving occupant comfort objectives, and reduces the design wind overturning moment by a factor of 1.7. Not only is this a lower-cost solution, it is also more sustainable as it uses less material, and leaves more valuable space inside the building.

Reductions in the quantities of concrete and reinforcing steel in the St Francis Towers structure due to the incorporation of the Arup damping system and performance based seismic design saved the building's developer in excess of $5 million in construction cost and more net floor space (through smaller columns and core walls, and no need for space for TMDs).

See also
 The Shang Grand Tower
 List of tallest buildings in the Philippines

References

External links
 St. Francis Tower 1 at Emporis Buildings
 St. Francis Tower 2 at Emporis Buildings
 St. Francis Towers at Skyscraperpage

Skyscrapers in Ortigas Center
Residential skyscrapers in Metro Manila
Twin towers
Residential buildings completed in 2009